Barnestown is an historic community located in Chester County, Pennsylvania. It is located at 40.1045447 -75.8099352. It operated a U.S. post office during the 1880s. Its elevation is 479 ft.

References 

 Sherwood, Andrew and Platt, Franklin. (1880). The Geology of Lycoming County. Harrisburg, PA 
 Pennsylvania Geological Survey, 2nd series, GG, ix, 160 p. illus. geol map. scale 1 in.=2 mi. 
 Wagontown survey, 1883

Populated places in Chester County, Pennsylvania